The Refugees of Parga is an 1831 oil on canvas painting by Francesco Hayez, now in the Pinacoteca Tosio Martinengo in Brescia. It shows Greek refugees fleeing Parga after the British sold it to the Ottoman Empire in 1819.

References

History paintings
1831 paintings
Paintings by Francesco Hayez
Paintings in the collection of the Pinacoteca Tosio Martinengo